

Leonard Zeskind is an American human rights activist. He is president of the Institute for Research and Education of Human Rights (IREHR). For thirteen years prior concentration on human rights, he worked in industry.

Since 1982, he has been a community activist and human rights advocate. He is known for his research into extreme right, racist, and anti-Semitic organizations in the United States. The Institute for Research and Education of Human Rights served as a resource about such groups and their members when information about them rose dramatically following the storming of the capitol of the United States on January 6, 2021.

He is a lifetime member of the NAACP. He also has served on the board of directors of the Petra Foundation and the Kansas City Jewish Community Relations Bureau.

Zeskind wrote the book entitled Blood and Politics.

Awards
 1998 MacArthur Fellows Program
 1992 Petra Foundation Fellowship

Works

Blood and Politics: The History of White Nationalism from the Margins to the Mainstream, Macmillan, 2009,

References

External links
Author's website
"Leonard Zeskind: Blood and Politics", Open Source Audio
"Right-Wing Extremism Expert Leonard Zeskind Analyzes the Movement That Nurtures Shooters Like Von Brunn and Roeder", Buzzflash, 06/11/2009
"Leonard Zeskind on the Minutemen", Everyday Citizen, Stuart Elliott, March 19, 2008
Leonard Zeskind featured on Real Law Radio, Leonard talks with Bob DiCello on the legal news talk radio program, Real Law Radio, about the infiltration of the Tea Party Movement by white supremacists (Podcasts/Saturday March 27, 2010).

American human rights activists
American male journalists
Living people
1950 births
MacArthur Fellows
Jewish American community activists
20th-century American journalists
21st-century American non-fiction writers
21st-century American male writers
21st-century American Jews